The 2015–16 VMI Keydets basketball team represented Virginia Military Institute in the 2015–16 NCAA Division I men's basketball season. The Keydets were led by first-year head coach Dan Earl and played their home games out of Cameron Hall, their home since 1981. Earl replaced Duggar Baucom, who departed for military rival The Citadel in March 2015. The Keydets played as a member of the Southern Conference for the second consecutive year, having been in the Big South Conference from 2003 to 2014. Prior to that, VMI was a member of the SoCon for nearly eighty years. They finished the season 9–21, 4–14 in SoCon play to finish in a tie for eighth place. They lost in the first round of the SoCon tournament to Samford.

Preseason

Departures
In addition to four seniors, VMI also lost sophomore forward Craig Hinton to transfer.

Coaching changes
In addition to the departure of Baucom, VMI assistant coaches Daniel Willis and Ryan Mattocks also left for The Citadel. Willis came to VMI in 2005 along with Baucom, and Mattocks was hired prior to the 2012–13 season. Additionally, the contract of assistant coach Ben Thompson, who was in his first season with the program, was not renewed.

In May, Earl announced three hires to the coaching staff: Steve Lepore, Chris Kreider, and Jason Slay. Lepore came from Hargrave Military Academy and played college basketball at Wake Forest where he graduated in 2003. Kreider most recently served as an assistant coach at George Mason for four seasons, and also worked with former Southern Conference member Georgia Southern for two years. Slay had been an assistant at SoCon rival East Tennessee State the past two seasons, and played collegiately at West Virginia State.

Recruiting

Roster

Depth chart

Schedule

|-
!colspan=9 style="background:#FF0000; color:#FFFF00;"| Regular season

|-
!colspan=9 style="background:#FF0000; color:#FFFF00;"| SoCon tournament

References

VMI Keydets basketball seasons
VMI
VMI Keydets bask
VMI Keydets bask